The Damang mine is one of the largest gold mines in the Ghana and in the world. The mine is located in the south-west of the country in the Western Region. The mine has estimated reserves of 10 million oz of gold. The mine is operated by  Abosso Goldfields Ltd a subsidiary of the South African Gold Fields, which was acquired by the South African company in 2002.

See also
Geology of Ghana
Birimian

References 

Gold mines in Ghana
Gold Fields